Loranthacydia is a genus of moths belonging to the family Tortricidae.

Species
Loranthacydia aulacodes (Lower, 1902)
Loranthacydia metallocosma (Lower, 1902)
Loranthacydia multilinea (Turner, 1945)
Loranthacydia pessota (Meyrick, 1911)
Loranthacydia sinapichroa (Turner, 1926)

See also
List of Tortricidae genera

References

External links
tortricidae.com

Tortricidae genera
Taxa named by Marianne Horak
Olethreutinae